Tommy DeCarlo (born April 23, 1965) is an American singer who is the current lead vocalist for the rock band Boston.

Biography 
DeCarlo was born in Rome, New York. He discovered and became a fan of Boston at age 12. Years later, he began writing his own music and in the 1990s began recording covers of himself singing his favorite Boston songs.

In March 2007, original Boston lead singer Brad Delp unexpectedly died at the age of 55. To honor Delp, DeCarlo wrote and recorded an original song about his favorite vocalist as well as a couple of Boston covers. His daughter suggested he post the songs on a Myspace page she helped him set up. He then decided to send his Myspace page link to Boston management. Not long after he was contacted by Boston founding member Tom Scholz. At the time, DeCarlo was working at a Charlotte area Home Depot as a Credit Manager. Tommy has been lead vocalist on Boston tours 2008, 2012, 2014, 2015, 2016, and 2017.

Recently, Tommy recorded and released an audiobook "Unlikely Rockstar -  The Tommy DeCarlo Story" which he narrates his life events from birth through his first performance with the band Boston in 2007. The recording of the book occurred throughout 2020 and 2021. The audiobook is currently available on audible.

Decarlo (band) 
DeCarlo formed the band Decarlo (stylized DECARLO) with his son Tommy DeCarlo Jr. in 2012.

The band signed a deal with Frontier Records Srl in October 2018 and released their first album on January 24, 2020, called Lightning Strikes Twice which earned them a featured article in popular Billboard Magazine as 2020 Grammy Contenders.

The title track "Lightning Strikes Twice" was released on October 28, 2019, the second single "There She Goes" was released on November 21, 2019, and the third and final single "A Better Day" was released on January 8, 2020. In 2022, Tommy signed a second record deal with Frontier Records Srl Tommy DeCarlo -  Dancing In The Moonlight (to be released December 2022.) Tommy is currently touring the U.S. and Canada with his son and guitarist Tommy DeCarlo Jr. and bassist Payton Velligan as part as a national touring act.

Discography

Studio albums
 Dancing In the Moonlight (2022)

with Boston
 Life, Love & Hope (2013) (DeCarlo provides lead vocals on "Life Love and Hope", "Someday", "You Gave Up on Love (2.0)", "The Way You Look Tonight")

with DeCarlo
 Lightning Strikes Twice (2020)
Singles
 "Lightning Strikes Twice" (2019)
 "There She Goes" (2019)
 "A Better Day" (2020)

References

External links 
Tommy Decarlo's – Unlikely Rockstar – The Tommy DeCarlo Story on Audible

1965 births
Musicians from Utica, New York
Living people
American male singers
Singers from New York (state)
Boston (band) members